Hemichela is a genus of sea spiders within the family Ammotheidae, with 3 currently assigned species.

Species 

 Hemichela longiunguis 
 Hemichela micrasterias 
 Hemichela nanhaiensis

References 

Pycnogonids
Chelicerate genera